= Philip, Duke of Brabant =

Philip or Philippe, Duke of Brabant may refer to:

- Philip I, Duke of Brabant (1427–1430), also known as Philip of Saint Pol
- Philip II, Duke of Brabant (1430–1467), also known as Philip the Good or Philip III, Duke of Burgundy
- Philip III, Duke of Brabant (1494–1506), also known as Philip the Handsome and later also named King Philip I of Castile
- Philip IV, Duke of Brabant (1555–1598), further known as King Philip II of Spain
- Philip V, Duke of Brabant (1621-1665), further known as King Philip III of Portugal and King Philip IV of Spain
- Philip VI, Duke of Brabant (1700-1706), further known as King Philip V of Spain or Philippe of Anjou
- Prince Philippe, Duke of Brabant (1993–2013), further known as King Philippe of Belgium
